Andhra Pradesh Pollution Control Board is a statutory organisation of Government of Andhra Pradesh to implement Environment protective laws and rules.

It was established on 24 January 1976 to control water pollution in Andhra Pradesh. The additional responsibility to control air pollution was given in 1981.

History and Administration

See also

Haryana State Pollution Control Board

See also
Awaaz Foundation: non-governmental organisation in India that works towards preserving and enhancing environment and other socially oriented causes.

External links
Official website

1976 establishments in Andhra Pradesh
Government agencies established in 1976
State agencies of Andhra Pradesh
State pollution control boards of India